Kitty Girl may refer to:

Music
Kitty Girls, band
Kitty Girls (album), a 2008 album by Kitty Girls
"Kitty Girl", a 2017 song by RuPaul from American

Other
Kitty Girl (horse), only horse to have won E. P. Taylor Stakes twice (1957, 1958)